The Tipulomorpha are an infraorder of Nematocera, containing the crane flies, a very large group, and allied families.

One recent classification based largely on fossils splits this group into a series of extinct superfamilies (below), and includes members of other infraorders, but this has not gained wide acceptance.

Extinct ranks
Superfamily Eopolyneuroidea
Family Eopolyneuridae - (Upper Triassic)
Family Musidoromimidae - (Upper Triassic)
Superfamily Tipulodictyoidea extinct
Family Tipulodictyidae - (Upper Triassic)
Superfamily Tanyderophryneoidea extinct
Family Tanyderophryneidae - (Middle Jurassic)
Superfamily Tipuloidea
Family Architipulidae extinct (Upper Triassic)-(Pan Jurassic)
Superfamily  Eoptychopteroidea extinct
Family Eoptychopteridae - (Lower Jurassic)

External links 

 Tree of Life Tipulomorpha

 
Insect infraorders